Arkhangelskoye is a rural locality (a selo) and the administrative center of Arkhangelskoye Rural Settlement, Anninsky District, Voronezh Oblast, Russia. The population was 2,165 as of 2018. There are 30 streets.

Geography 
Arkhangelskoye is located 38 km east of Anna (the district's administrative centre) by road. Ostrovki is the nearest rural locality.

References 

Rural localities in Anninsky District